Mohamed Lamine Doumouya (born 9 January 1995) is an Ivorian football midfielder.

References 

1995 births
Living people
Ivorian footballers
Africa Sports d'Abidjan players
Ullensaker/Kisa IL players
ES Bingerville players
SC Gagnoa players
FC Shirak players
Al-Ahli Club (Manama) players
Stade Tunisien players
Najran SC players
CS Hammam-Lif players
Maghreb de Fès players
Association football midfielders
Norwegian First Division players
Ivorian expatriate footballers
Expatriate footballers in Norway
Ivorian expatriate sportspeople in Norway
Expatriate footballers in Armenia
Ivorian expatriate sportspeople in Armenia
Expatriate footballers in Bahrain
Ivorian expatriate sportspeople in Bahrain
Expatriate footballers in Tunisia
Ivorian expatriate sportspeople in Tunisia
Expatriate footballers in Saudi Arabia
Ivorian expatriate sportspeople in Saudi Arabia
Expatriate footballers in Morocco
Ivorian expatriate sportspeople in Morocco